Intkhedi Sadak is a village in the Bhopal district of Madhya Pradesh, India. It is located in the Huzur tehsil and the Phanda block.

Intkhedi is one among four villages of erstwhile Bhopal State were 173 Malayali families from Travancore–Cochin state was rehabilitated as part of Second Nehru ministry's Central Mechanised Farming Project in 1955. The other three such settlements are villages of  Imillia, Urdumao and Majoos Kalan in Raisen district. These people were brought for promotion of Tapioca and Paddy cultivation but the project was prematurely abandoned in 1956 after formation of Madhya Pradesh state.

Demographics 

According to the 2011 census of India, Intkhedi Sadak has 500 households. The effective literacy rate (i.e. the literacy rate of population excluding children aged 6 and below) is 62.53%. The major spoken language of village is Hindi. However there is a significant number of Malayalam language speakers who reside in the village.

See also 

 Daya Bai
Dandakaranya Project

References 

Villages in Huzur tehsil